Coclé is a province of central Panama on the nation's southern coast. The administrative capital is the city of Penonomé.  This province was created by the Act of September 12, 1855 with the title of Department of Coclé during the presidency of Dr. Justo de Arosemena. It became a province, Decretory Number 190, on October 20, 1985. Coclé is primarily an agricultural area, with sugar and tomatoes as major crops.  The province has a number of well-known beaches, such as Santa Clara, Farallon and Rio Hato, and tourist activity has increased in recent years. It covers an area of 4,946.6 sq.km, and had a population of 265,149 in 2019.

Pre-Columbian Coclé 

During pre-Columbian times, the area of Panama which today includes Coclé province had a number of identifiable native cultures.  Archaeologists have loosely designated these cultures by pottery style.  The poorly studied La Mula period ranged from 150 BC to AD 300.  It was followed by the Tonosi period, from AD 300 to AD 550, and by the Cubita period, from AD 550 to AD 700.  A unified Indigenous culture appears to have flourished in this area from approximately 1200 BC until the 16th century.

Administrative divisions 
Coclé Province is divided into 6 distritos (districts) and subdivided into 44 corregimientos.

Research and conservation 
Parque Nacional General de División Omar Torrijos Herrera, established around the crash site of former Panamanian leader Omar Torrijos, is located in the northeastern portion of Coclé. Parque Omar, as it is known, enjoys some legal protection as a national park.

Coclé is also home to APROVACA orchid conservation center, which conducts orchid conservation activities, including orchid reintroduction into the wild and a sponsorship program for the Panamanian national flower Peristeria elata.

Folklorist Rosita Liao Gonzales was awarded the Order of Manuel José Hurtado for her work categorizing the cultures of Coclé Province.

References 
 Lothrop, Samuel Kirland.  Pre-Columbian Designs from Panama -Illustrations of Coclé Pottery.  Dover Publications, Toronto, Canada, 1976.  .

Specific

External links 
 Coclé Archaeological Sites
 Sito Conte On-Line Collection, University of Pennsylvania Museum
 Pre-Columbian Gold artifacts from the Cocle Province
 Pre-Columbian Jade artifacts from the Cocle Province
 Pre-Columbian Stone artifacts from Cocle
 Pre-Columbian Pottery from Cocle
 Listing of Additional Archaeological Websites

 
Provinces of Panama
Pre-Columbian pottery
States and territories established in 1855
1855 establishments in the Republic of New Granada